The Asia/Oceania Zone was the unique zone within Group 4 of the regional Davis Cup competition in 2018. The zone's competition was held in round robin format in Muscat, Oman, from 29 January to 3 February 2018. The two winning nations won promotion to Group III, Asia/Oceania Zone in 2019.

Participating nations

Inactive nations

Draw
Date: 29 January–3 February

Location: Sultan Qaboos Sports Complex, Muscat, Oman (hard)

Format: Round-robin basis. Two pools of six teams. The winner of Pool A will play-off against the runner-up in Pool B and the winner of Pool B will play-off against the runner-up in Pool A to determine which two nations will be promoted to Asia/Oceania Zone Group III in 2019.

Seeding

 1Davis Cup Rankings as of 27 November 2017

Round Robin

Pool A

Pool B 

Standings are determined by: 1. number of wins; 2. number of matches; 3. in two-team ties, head-to-head records; 4. in three-team ties, (a) percentage of sets won (head-to-head records if two teams remain tied), then (b) percentage of games won (head-to-head records if two teams remain tied), then (c) Davis Cup rankings.

Playoffs 

Round Robin

Pool A

United Arab Emirates vs. Kyrgyzstan

Oman vs. Bangladesh

Myanmar vs. Iraq

United Arab Emirates vs. Bangladesh

Oman vs. Iraq

Myanmar vs. Kyrgyzstan

United Arab Emirates vs. Myanmar

Oman vs. Kyrgyzstan

Iraq vs. Bangladesh

United Arab Emirates vs. Iraq

Oman vs. Myanmar

Bangladesh vs. Kyrgyzstan

United Arab Emirates vs. Oman

Myanmar vs. Bangladesh

Iraq vs. Kyrgyzstan

Pool B

Singapore vs. Guam

Turkmenistan vs. Tajikistan

Mongolia vs. Bahrain

Singapore vs. Tajikistan

Turkmenistan vs. Bahrain

Mongolia vs. Guam

Singapore vs. Mongolia

Turkmenistan vs. Guam

Bahrain vs. Tajikistan

Singapore vs. Turkmenistan

Mongolia vs. Tajikistan

Bahrain vs. Guam

Singapore vs. Bahrain

Turkmenistan vs. Mongolia

Tajikistan vs. Guam

Playoffs

Promotional Playoffs

Oman vs. Guam

Singapore vs. United Arab Emirates

5th Place Playoff

Iraq vs. Bahrain

7th Place Playoff

Myanmar vs. Mongolia

9th Place Playoff

Bangladesh vs. Turkmenistan

11th Place Playoff

Kyrgyzstan vs. Tajikistan

References

External links
Official Website

Asia/Oceania Zone Group IV
Davis Cup Asia/Oceania Zone